Eastern Parkway is a major road that runs through a portion of the New York City borough of Brooklyn. Designed by Frederick Law Olmsted and Calvert Vaux, it was the world's first parkway, having been built between 1870 and 1874. At the time of its construction, Eastern Parkway went to the eastern edge of Brooklyn, hence its name.

The road begins at Grand Army Plaza (the main entrance to Prospect Park) and extends east to Ralph Avenue, along the crest of the moraine that separates northern from southern Long Island. This section runs parallel to Atlantic Avenue and is aligned with the Crown Heights street grid. East of Ralph Avenue, it turns to the northeast, still following the moraine, until it terminates at Bushwick Avenue near the Evergreen Cemetery, where the moraine climbs steeply toward a peak at Ridgewood Reservoir. The initial portion of Eastern Parkway, west of Ralph Avenue, contains landscaped medians and is officially called by that name. The part east of Ralph Avenue is narrower and is officially known as Eastern Parkway Extension.

Eastern Parkway was built with the expectation that it would be the centerpiece of a neighborhood with "first-class" housing. Ultimately, the resulting development encompassed a variety of building styles including single-family homes, mansions, and apartment buildings. The parkway extension east of Ralph Avenue was built in the late 1890s. The neighborhoods around the parkway developed into a "Doctor's Row" in the late 19th century, and further settlement occurred with the opening of the New York City Subway's Eastern Parkway Line in 1920. The section of Eastern Parkway west of Ralph Avenue is a New York City designated landmark and on the National Register of Historic Places.

Route description
In the short westernmost portion, between Grand Army Plaza and Prospect Park (where it intersects with Prospect Park West, Flatbush Avenue, and Vanderbilt Avenue) and Washington Avenue, the thoroughfare consists of a broad, bidirectional avenue of six lanes, separated by a median from a narrow parallel service road on the north side. It passes Brooklyn Central Library, Brooklyn Museum, Mount Prospect Park, and Brooklyn Botanic Garden in this area; all of these are located on the south side of Eastern Parkway. The section between Washington and Ralph Avenues has a second service road on the south side, separated by another median. The parkway passes Bedford, Rogers, and Nostrand Avenues in this fashion before passing Chabad-Lubavitch world headquarters and the Jewish Children's Museum in Crown Heights. It continues east, crossing Utica and Ralph Avenues.

East of Ralph Avenue, the parkway is reduced to six lanes, heading in a northeasterly direction toward Bushwick Avenue. Here, Eastern Parkway officially becomes the Eastern Parkway Extension (though signage saying this only appears northeast of Broadway) and curves northeast to intersect with Howard Avenue, Atlantic Avenue, Fulton Street, and Broadway. In this area, Eastern Parkway runs diagonally to the rest of the street grid, creating several oblique intersections. At Bushwick Avenue, the Extension becomes Vanderveer Street, a dead-end street. The extension connects to the Jackie Robinson Parkway, three blocks southeast, via Bushwick Avenue.

Originally, Eastern Parkway east of Ralph Avenue continued down present-day Pitkin Avenue toward where Aqueduct Racetrack is today. The addresses along Pitkin Avenue are continuations of those on Eastern Parkway. Pitkin Avenue was created by the late 1890s when the Eastern Parkway Extension was constructed. Eastern Park, the home of the Brooklyn Dodgers before Ebbets Field, was located at Eastern Parkway and Vesta Avenue (now Pitkin Avenue at Van Sinderen Avenue, respectively).

Design 

Eastern Parkway is credited as the world's first parkway to be built explicitly for personal and recreational traffic while restricting commercial traffic. Frederick Law Olmsted, the parkway's co-designer, described a parkway as "a shaded green ribbon" which might "be absolutely formal or strikingly picturesque, according to circumstances." Eastern and Ocean Parkways were planned together, though Eastern Parkway was intended to be the more grand of the two. Both medians have trees, benches, and paths for pedestrians. These medians contain sidewalks with hexagonal asphalt tiles and benches made of concrete or wood.

This section has a narrower median of between  separating each direction of traffic. There are three lanes in each direction.

Originally, there were 1,100 trees planted in the medians. As such, Olmsted placed elm trees along the main road and a variety of trees consisting mostly of maples on the service roads. These were provided by John Condor's Brooklyn nursery.  The southern median has a bike path, part of the Brooklyn-Queens Greenway which runs south from the western end through Prospect Park to Ocean Parkway and east from the eastern end through Forest Park. The southern median's bike path is separated from the pedestrian path by way of a "rumble strip" between the pedestrian and bike lanes. The northern median is for pedestrians only. Many trees along the parkway bear plaques commemorating soldiers fallen in World War I. Today, the trees come from about 25 different species.

Traffic and safety 
Between Grand Army Plaza and Ralph Avenue, most traffic uses the main road of Eastern Parkway, while the service roads tend to be used by local traffic; commercial vehicles are prohibited on all of the roadways. However, trucks are allowed on the Eastern Parkway Extension, where traffic loads are heavy throughout the day. In practice, neither section of Eastern Parkway is designated as a local truck route.

All of the intersections of Eastern Parkway's main road, between Grand Army Plaza and Ralph Avenue, contain traffic lights on the main road. However, at certain intersections, only one of the two service roads have traffic lights, while the other service road generally contains a stop sign. More specifically, at intersections with northbound cross-streets, only the main road and eastbound service road contain a traffic light, and at intersections with southbound cross-streets, the main road and westbound service road contain a traffic light. At intersections with two-way streets, both service roads and the main roads generally contain a traffic light. Since the parkway was not designed for modern traffic loads, traffic lights and crosswalks at the service roads were installed in a piecemeal fashion, creating inconsistencies even between adjacent intersections. At many intersections, there are also no crosswalks between the traffic medians; at intersections where the service roads use stop signs, crosswalks at the curbs of the service roads are also missing.

Due to its width, as well as the lack of traffic lights on some service roads, Eastern Parkway contains a number of dangerous intersections, especially at those with two-way cross streets or one-way southbound cross streets. This is exacerbated by cars attempting to turn from the main road onto the side streets, who frequently block the crosswalk or make quick turns onto these streets. One of the more dangerous intersections along Eastern Parkway is at Utica Avenue, a two-way street, frequently regarded as the most dangerous intersection in Brooklyn. This was once the second-most-dangerous intersection in the city, with eighty-eight pedestrians being hurt and four being killed between 1995 and 2001. Another intersection with Washington Avenue, a two-way street, formerly lacked a traffic light for the northbound service road. Between 1995 and 2005, the intersection of Eastern Parkway and Washington Avenue saw one fatality and thirty-nine injuries. The segment between Grand Army Plaza and Washington Avenue was later upgraded with a traffic light and bike lane.

Because of the high number of traffic incidents on Eastern Parkway, the parkway is designated as a Vision Zero traffic safety "priority corridor". In an effort to reduce injuries, the city proposed installing traffic signals on all of the service roads during the 2010s.

History

Planning and construction 
Eastern Parkway is located on the high edge of Harbor Hill Moraine, a terminal moraine. Approximately 17,000 years ago the moraine of the receding Wisconsin Glacier that formed Long Island established a string of hills. Mount Prospect (or Prospect Hill), near the present-day intersection of Flatbush Avenue and Eastern Parkway, is one of the tallest hills in Brooklyn, rising 200 feet (61 m) above sea level. During the American Revolutionary War (1775-1783), the area was a site of the Battle of Long Island (aka Battle of Brooklyn). American forces attempted to hold Battle Pass, an opening in the terminal moraine where the old Flatbush Road passed from the villages of Brooklyn to Flatbush. It fell after some of the heaviest fighting in the engagement, and its loss contributed to George Washington's decision to retreat. Even though the Continental Army lost the battle, they were able to hold the British back long enough for Washington's army to escape across the East River to Manhattan.

Frederick Law Olmsted and Calvert Vaux, who were also responsible for Central Park and Prospect Park, suggested the construction of Eastern Parkway and Ocean Parkway to Brooklyn park commissioners in reports prepared in 1866. The proposed Ocean and Eastern Parkways would connect Prospect Park with Coney Island and East New York, respectively. Their plan for the parkways were inspired by boulevards such as Under den Linden in Berlin and Avenue Foch in Paris. However, Ocean and Eastern Parkways were considered to be improvements over these two thoroughfares, since both would contain service roads separated from the main road by tree-lined medians. Olmsted and Vaux intended the parkways to be the center of a parkway system which would connect several parks in Brooklyn. While this plan did not come to fruition, it spurred plans for other park and parkway systems in the United States.

At the time, the road was known as Sackett Street. On May 6, 1868, the New York State Legislature approved the street's widening between Washington and Ralph Avenues, the latter street being the boundary of the City of Brooklyn at the time. The grading of the site began in August 1870, and because the road was to run at the top of the high ridge of a moraine, this work was difficult. The grading resulted in the excavation of topsoil that was then used to landscape the medians. Gangs of workmen started to break up stone for gravel, paving stones, and Belgian blocks. By August 10, 1871, grading between Washington and Ralph Avenues had been completed and paving had begun. It was expected that, considering Prospect Park was nearly complete, the parkway would be finished along with the park.

By 1874, Eastern Parkway was considered to be completed, and lots were put for sale on the route of the parkway. The Report of the Brooklyn Park Commissioners for the Years 1874-1879, contained a description of "Parkways, Avenues, Streets and Roads, graded, paved and otherwise improved by the Brooklyn Park Commissioners" between 1866 and 1879. The report classified Ocean Parkway as a "gravel roadway" and Eastern Parkway as being of "macadam stone, Belgian block and cobble". Specifically, the main road was paved with macadam while the service roads were of stone blocks.

Late 19th century 

In conjunction with the development of Eastern Parkway, a special zoning ordinance was implemented (see ). The plan was supposed to spur "first-class" construction on the parkway, and according to Brooklyn borough president James S. T. Stranahan, similar development had occurred in Brooklyn Heights and at the original location of Columbia College. However, development was stymied by disputes over the ownership of the "East Side Lands" of Prospect Park, at the parkway's western end. The park commission was unable to sell it for profit, and so it lay undeveloped until a guarantee company vouched for the title in 1910.

Like some later roads on Long Island, Eastern Parkway was designed to use land that was idle because it was high, rocky, and unsuited to farming.  The presence of the road, however, made the area residentially desirable for people whose income derived from elsewhere. Thus it became inhabited in the next few decades, while land on slopes to the south and north continued to be used for farms into the 20th century. Eastern Parkway divided the Crow Hill section of Crown Heights to the south and the African American village of Weeksville to the north. The area became known as "Doctor's Row" due to the high concentration of professionals that moved to the area by the 20th century.

While borough president Stranahan originally envisioned one large park between Prospect Park and Jamaica, Queens (with the parks being connected via Eastern Parkway), the city's rapid development made this impossible. Eastern Parkway was originally routed along the current route of Pitkin Avenue east of Ralph Avenue, but a new Eastern Parkway Extension was built in the late 1890s. The extension traveled northeast to near Cemetery of the Evergreens, Highland Park, and the Ridgewood Reservoir at the southwestern end of Brooklyn and Queens' Cemetery Belt. Work started in 1896 and was performed in three phases. A further extension eastward, in the early 20th century, was originally planned as part of Eastern Parkway, but later became Interboro (now Jackie Robinson) Parkway.

20th and 21st centuries 

By the early 1900s, the area around Eastern Parkway had been developed; though a few single-family homes had been built, mostly along President Street, the majority of structures did not follow Olmsted's 1868 zoning regulations. The service roads were widened in 1907.

The 1900s also brought proposals for New York City Subway lines to Brooklyn, several of which were planned to travel under major arteries in central Brooklyn. It was expected that such construction would accelerate development along their respective corridors. One such route, the Interborough Rapid Transit Company (IRT)'s Eastern Parkway Line, was completed between Bowling Green in Manhattan and Atlantic Avenue in Brooklyn in 1908, running under the East River via the Joralemon Street Tunnel. A second route to the Eastern Parkway Line, the Clark Street Tunnel, opened in 1919. The subway line was further extended under Flatbush Avenue and Eastern Parkway starting in 1915. The section under Eastern Parkway included a tunnel section between Grand Army Plaza and Utica Avenue. In 1920, the Eastern Parkway Line was opened from Atlantic Avenue to Utica Avenue, with four intermediate stops under Eastern Parkway and two additional stations on the route. This resulted in a large migration of Jews and African-Americans, who moved into high-rise buildings along Eastern Parkway. These developments included Copley Plaza and Turner Towers, as well as the Lubavitch world headquarters.

In its heyday, Eastern Parkway was seen as a good example of road design; a 1939 Works Progress Administration guidebook stated that Eastern Parkway "recalls the Champs-Elysees". In 1976, Borough President Sebastian Leone asked the New York City Landmarks Preservation Commission to designate Eastern Parkway a city scenic landmark, following a similar designation for Ocean Parkway. Two years later, the parkway was declared a scenic landmark. The parkway was also listed on the National Register of Historic Places on September 26, 1983.

In 1987, the city announced plans to renovate Eastern Parkway between Grand Army Plaza and Pitkin Avenue. The project entailed installing water and sewage pipes, as well as rebuilding the roadways, sidewalks, and medians. Granite curbs were installed; benches, street lights, and traffic signs were replaced; and a bike lane with hexagonal asphalt blocks was added. The median was replanted and 1,000 trees were added. A $59 million, three-year contract was awarded to Naclerio Contracting Company in 1987, but the company filed bankruptcy in 1990 without finishing the project. Despite this, the city refused to fire Naclerio, though they did file a lawsuit to force the renovation's completion. The project was nearly completed by 1992.

In the early 2010s, the  section between Grand Army Plaza and Washington Avenue was again reconstructed, this time with a westbound bike lane in the northern median and a traffic light at the intersection with Washington Avenue. In 2017, as part of the Vision Zero traffic-safety plan, the city also proposed installing traffic signals on all of the service roads.

Structures 
The design of the original parkway was supposed to spur the construction of prestigious residential structures between Douglas Street to the north and President Street to the south. For the service roads, Olmsted proposed to have exclusively "first class" residences with buildings set back  from the sidewalk. The service roads themselves would be relegated to  driveways filled only with greenhouses, carriage houses, and stables. In accordance with this, Douglas and President Streets were widened; the "first class" housing restriction was implemented, but repealed in 1903 due to a lack of enforcement. Other restrictions were put in place, including a requirement that all proposed plantings be approved first.

Today, Eastern Parkway contains a variety of zoning uses. While the parkway is mostly zoned for mid-to-high-rise residential structures, there are also small areas of commercial zoning, as well as industrial zoning at the extreme eastern end, where there is a high concentration of transit-related infrastructure in the area around Broadway Junction. In addition, high-rise zoning is allowed at the western end, especially closer to Grand Army Plaza. Eastern Parkway is lined with one-and-two-family rowhouses, apartment complexes, semi-detached residences, and freestanding mansions. These coexist with some of the grander structures on the parkway, such as the Beaux-Arts Brooklyn Museum and the neoclassical and Modern Classical Central Library. Commercial uses are more common at Franklin, Nostrand, Kingston, Schenectady, and Utica Avenues, where there are subway entrances. Generally, Eastern Parkway Extension has fewer institutions or commercial structures, while predominating in residential or industrial uses.

Present-day attractions and notable buildings along Eastern Parkway include the Brooklyn Museum, the Brooklyn Public Library's central branch, the Brooklyn Botanic Garden, the Lubavitch world headquarters at 770 Eastern Parkway, Zion Triangle, and the Jewish Children's Museum. There are also numerous parks along Eastern Parkway's route. In addition to Prospect and Highland Parks, Eastern Parkway passes by Mount Prospect Park at its west end, as well as Callahan and Kelly Playground at its eastern end. There are also numerous schools and educational institutions, such as PS 155, PS 157, PS 167, Prospect High School, Clara Barton High School, and Medgar Evers College.

In Crown Heights, Eastern Parkway divides the black community to the north and the Jewish community to the south. This separation was highlighted during the 1991 Crown Heights riot, which occurred after one of the cars in Rebbe Menachem Mendel Schneerson's motorcade struck two Guyanese children (one fatally). Eastern Parkway also divides the two community boards that serve Crown Heights: Brooklyn Community Board 8 to the north and Brooklyn Community Board 9 to the south.

Events 
Eastern Parkway is the route of the West Indian Day Parade, a festive annual celebration taking place during J'ouvert, around Labor Day. The parade, which has been held on Eastern Parkway since the late 1960s, attracts between one and three million participants each year. However, the West Indian Day Parade has also been the site of shootings and stabbings on the route, both during and following the parade.

Transportation
The B14 and westbound B17 buses of MTA Regional Bus Operations travel on the parkway for short stretches.

References

External links

Crown Heights, Brooklyn
East New York, Brooklyn
Frederick Law Olmsted works
Jews and Judaism in Brooklyn
National Register of Historic Places in Brooklyn
New York City Designated Landmarks in Brooklyn
New York City scenic landmarks
Parks in Brooklyn
Parks on the National Register of Historic Places in New York City
Parkways in New York City
Roads on the National Register of Historic Places in New York (state)
Streets in Brooklyn